PHP is a general-purpose scripting language geared toward web development. It was originally created by Danish-Canadian programmer Rasmus Lerdorf in 1993 and released in 1995. The PHP reference implementation is now produced by The PHP Group. PHP was originally an abbreviation of Personal Home Page, but it now stands for the recursive initialism PHP: Hypertext Preprocessor.

PHP code is usually processed on a web server by a PHP interpreter implemented as a module, a daemon or as a Common Gateway Interface (CGI) executable.  On a web server, the result of the interpreted and executed PHP code which may be any type of data, such as generated HTML or binary image data would form the whole or part of an HTTP response.  Various web template systems, web content management systems, and web frameworks exist which can be employed to orchestrate or facilitate the generation of that response. Additionally, PHP can be used for many programming tasks outside the web context, such as standalone graphical applications and robotic drone control. PHP code can also be directly executed from the command line.

The standard PHP interpreter, powered by the Zend Engine, is free software released under the PHP License. PHP has been widely ported and can be deployed on most web servers on a variety of operating systems and platforms.

The PHP language evolved without a written formal specification or standard until 2014, with the original implementation acting as the de facto standard which other implementations aimed to follow. Since 2014, work has gone on to create a formal PHP specification.

W3Techs reports that , "PHP is used by 77.8% of all the websites whose server-side programming language we know." It also reports that only 8% of PHP users use the currently supported 8.x versions. Most use unsupported PHP 7, more specifically 7.4, and even PHP 5 has 23% of the use, also not supported with security updates, and known to have serious security vulnerabilities.

History

Early history 
PHP development began in 1993 when Rasmus Lerdorf wrote several Common Gateway Interface (CGI) programs in C, which he used to maintain his personal homepage. He extended them to work with web forms and to communicate with databases, and called this implementation "Personal Home Page/Forms Interpreter" or PHP/FI.

PHP/FI could be used to build simple, dynamic web applications. To accelerate bug reporting and improve the code, Lerdorf initially announced the release of PHP/FI as "Personal Home Page Tools (PHP Tools) version 1.0" on the Usenet discussion group comp.infosystems.www.authoring.cgi on June 8, 1995. This release already had the basic functionality that PHP has today. This included Perl-like variables, form handling, and the ability to embed HTML. The syntax resembled that of Perl, but was simpler, more limited and less consistent.

An example of the early PHP syntax:

<!--include /text/header.html-->

<!--getenv HTTP_USER_AGENT-->
<!--if substr $exec_result Mozilla-->
  Hey, you are using Netscape!<p>
<!--endif-->

<!--sql database select * from table where user='$username'-->
<!--ifless $numentries 1-->
  Sorry, that record does not exist<p>
<!--endif exit-->
  Welcome <!--$user-->!<p>
  You have <!--$index:0--> credits left in your account.<p>

<!--include /text/footer.html-->

Early PHP was not intended to be a new programming language, and grew organically, with Lerdorf noting in retrospect: "I don't know how to stop it, there was never any intent to write a programming language [...] I have absolutely no idea how to write a programming language, I just kept adding the next logical step on the way." A development team began to form and, after months of work and beta testing, officially released PHP/FI 2 in November 1997.

The fact that PHP was not originally designed, but instead was developed organically has led to inconsistent naming of functions and inconsistent ordering of their parameters. In some cases, the function names were chosen to match the lower-level libraries which PHP was "wrapping", while in some very early versions of PHP the length of the function names was used internally as a hash function, so names were chosen to improve the distribution of hash values.

PHP 3 and 4 

Zeev Suraski and Andi Gutmans rewrote the parser in 1997 and formed the base of PHP 3, changing the language's name to the recursive acronym PHP: Hypertext Preprocessor. Afterwards, public testing of PHP 3 began, and the official launch came in June 1998. Suraski and Gutmans then started a new rewrite of PHP's core, producing the Zend Engine in 1999. They also founded Zend Technologies in Ramat Gan, Israel.

On 22 May 2000, PHP 4, powered by the Zend Engine 1.0, was released. By August 2008, this branch had reached version 4.4.9. PHP 4 is now no longer under development and nor are any security updates planned to be released.

PHP 5 
On 1 July 2004, PHP 5 was released, powered by the new Zend Engine II. PHP 5 included new features such as improved support for object-oriented programming, the PHP Data Objects (PDO) extension (which defines a lightweight and consistent interface for accessing databases), and numerous performance enhancements. In 2008, PHP 5 became the only stable version under development. Late static binding had been missing from previous versions of PHP, and was added in version 5.3.

Many high-profile open-source projects ceased to support PHP 4 in new code from February 5, 2008, because of the GoPHP5 initiative, provided by a consortium of PHP developers promoting the transition from PHP 4 to PHP 5.

Over time, PHP interpreters became available on most existing 32-bit and 64-bit operating systems, either by building them from the PHP source code or by using pre-built binaries. For PHP versions 5.3 and 5.4, the only available Microsoft Windows binary distributions were 32-bit IA-32 builds, requiring Windows 32-bit compatibility mode while using Internet Information Services (IIS) on a 64-bit Windows platform. PHP version 5.5 made the 64-bit x86-64 builds available for Microsoft Windows.

Official security support for PHP 5.6 ended on 31 December 2018.

PHP 6 and Unicode 
PHP received mixed reviews due to lacking native Unicode support at the core language level. In 2005, a project headed by Andrei Zmievski was initiated to bring native Unicode support throughout PHP, by embedding the International Components for Unicode (ICU) library, and representing text strings as UTF-16 internally. Since this would cause major changes both to the internals of the language and to user code, it was planned to release this as version 6.0 of the language, along with other major features then in development.

However, a shortage of developers who understood the necessary changes, and performance problems arising from conversion to and from UTF-16, which is rarely used in a web context, led to delays in the project. As a result, a PHP 5.3 release was created in 2009, with many non-Unicode features back-ported from PHP 6, notably namespaces. In March 2010, the project in its current form was officially abandoned, and a PHP 5.4 release was prepared to contain most remaining non-Unicode features from PHP 6, such as traits and closure re-binding. Initial hopes were that a new plan would be formed for Unicode integration, but by 2014 none had been adopted.

PHP 7
During 2014 and 2015, a new major PHP version was developed, PHP 7. The numbering of this version involved some debate among internal developers. While the PHP 6 Unicode experiments had never been released, several articles and book titles referenced the PHP 6 names, which might have caused confusion if a new release were to reuse the name. After a vote, the name PHP 7 was chosen.

The foundation of PHP 7 is a PHP branch that was originally dubbed PHP next generation (phpng). It was authored by Dmitry Stogov, Xinchen Hui and Nikita Popov, and aimed to optimize PHP performance by refactoring the Zend Engine while retaining near-complete language compatibility. By 14 July 2014, WordPress-based benchmarks, which served as the main benchmark suite for the phpng project, showed an almost 100% increase in performance. Changes from phpng make it easier to improve performance in future versions, as more compact data structures and other changes are seen as better suited for a successful migration to a just-in-time (JIT) compiler. Because of the significant changes, the reworked Zend Engine was called Zend Engine 3, succeeding Zend Engine 2 used in PHP 5.

Because of the major internal changes in phpng, it must receive a new major version number of PHP, rather than a minor PHP 5 release, according to PHP's release process. Major versions of PHP are allowed to break backward-compatibility of code and therefore PHP 7 presented an opportunity for other improvements beyond phpng that require backward-compatibility breaks. In particular, it involved the following changes:
 Many fatal or recoverable-level legacy PHP error mechanisms were replaced with modern object-oriented exceptions.
 The syntax for variable dereferencing was reworked to be internally more consistent and complete, allowing the use of the operators ->, [],,{}, and ::, with arbitrary meaningful left-side expressions.
 Support for legacy PHP 4-style constructor methods was deprecated.
 The behavior of the foreach statement was changed to be more predictable.
 Constructors for the few classes built-in to PHP which returned null upon failure were changed to throw an exception instead, for consistency.
 Several unmaintained or deprecated server application programming interfaces (SAPIs) and extensions were removed from the PHP core, most notably the legacy mysql extension.
 The behavior of the list() operator was changed to remove support for strings.
 Support was removed for legacy ASP-style delimiters <% and %> and <script language="php"> ... </script>.
 An oversight allowing a switch statement to have multiple default clauses was fixed.
 Support for hexadecimal number support in some implicit conversions from strings to number types was removed.
 The left-shift and right-shift operators were changed to behave more consistently across platforms.
 Conversions between floating-point numbers and integers were changed (e.g. infinity changed to convert to zero) and implemented more consistently across platforms.

PHP 7 also included new language features. Most notably, it introduced return type declarations for functions which complement the existing parameter type declarations, and support for the scalar types (integer, float, string, and boolean) in parameter and return type declarations.

PHP 8 
PHP 8 was released on November 26, 2020. PHP 8 is a major version and has breaking changes from previous versions. New features and notable changes include:

Just-in-time compilation 
Just-in-time compilation is supported in PHP 8.

PHP 8's JIT compiler can provide substantial performance improvements for some use cases, while PHP developer Nikita Popov stated that the performance improvements for most websites will be less substantial than the upgrade from PHP 5 to PHP 7. Substantial improvements are expected more for mathematical-type operations than for common web-development use cases. Additionally, the JIT compiler provides the future potential to move some code from C to PHP, due to the performance improvements for some use cases.

Addition of the match expression

PHP 8 introduced the  expression. The match expression is conceptually similar to a  statement and is more compact for some use cases. Because  is an expression, its result can be assigned to a variable or returned from a function.

Type changes and additions 
PHP 8 introduced union types, a new  return type, and a new  type.

"Attributes", often referred to as "annotations" in other programming languages, were added in PHP 8, which allow metadata to be added to classes.

 was changed from being a statement to being an expression. This allows exceptions to be thrown in places that were not previously possible.

Syntax changes and additions 
PHP 8 includes changes to allow alternate, more concise, or more consistent syntaxes in a number of scenarios. For example, the nullsafe operator is similar to the null coalescing operator , but used when calling methods. The following code snippet will not throw an error if  returns null:

$human_readable_date = $user->getBirthday()?->diffForHumans();

Constructor property promotion has been added as "syntactic sugar," allowing class properties to be set automatically when parameters are passed into a class constructor. This reduces the amount of boilerplate code that must be written.

Standard library changes and additions 
 Weak maps were added in PHP 8. A  holds references to objects, but these references do not prevent such objects from being garbage collected. This can provide performance improvements in scenarios where data is being cached; this is of particular relevance for object relational mappings (ORM).
 Various adjustments to interfaces, such as adding support for creating  objects from interfaces, and the addition of a  interface that can be used for type hinting.
 Various new functions including str_contains(), str_starts_with(), and str_ends_with(); fdiv(); get_debug_type(); and get_resource_id()
 Object implementation of token_get_all()

Additional changes 
 Type annotations were also added into PHP's C source code itself to allow internal functions and methods to have "complete type information in reflection."
 Inheritance with private methods
 Abstract methods in traits improvements

PHP 8.1 
PHP 8.1 was released on December 8, 2021, and included a number of new features and improvements over previous versions. Here is a more detailed look at some of the key features and improvements in PHP 8.1:

 Union types: This feature allows you to specify that a variable can have multiple types, such as an integer or a string. This can be useful for writing more flexible and robust code, as it allows you to handle a wider range of input values.
 Nullsafe operator: This operator allows you to chain method calls without worrying about null references. For example, if you want to call a method on an object that may be null, you can use the null safe operator to ensure that the method is only called if the object is not null.
 Match expression: This is a more concise and flexible way to perform matching on values. It allows you to specify multiple cases and their associated values, and then use the match keyword to select the appropriate case based on the value of an expression.
 Improved performance: PHP 8.1 includes various performance improvements, such as faster array operations and better memory usage. These improvements can help make your code run faster and more efficiently.
 New error handling features: PHP 8.1 introduces a new throws keyword that allows you to specify which exceptions a function can throw, and a new assert() function that can be used to check for certain conditions at runtime. These features can help you write more reliable and robust code.
 Other new features: PHP 8.1 also includes other new features such as support for named arguments, support for attributes (similar to annotations in other languages), and improved support for Unicode.

The match expression is a new feature in PHP 8.1 that allows you to perform value matching in a more concise and flexible way. It is similar to a switch statement, but with some additional features and syntax improvements.

Here is an example of how you can use the match expression in PHP:$value = 3;

$result = match ($value) {
  0 => 'The value is zero',
  1, 2, 3 => 'The value is one, two, or three',
  default => 'The value is something else',
};

echo $result; // Outputs: "The value is one, two, or three"In this example, the match expression compares the value of $value to the different cases specified in the curly braces. If $value matches one of the cases, the corresponding value is returned. If none of the cases matches, the default case is used.

One of the main benefits of the match expression is that it allows you to specify multiple values for a single case, as shown in the example above. This can help make your code more concise and easier to read.

Assert() Error handling

The assert() function and the throws keyword are new error-handling features in PHP 8.1 that can help you write more reliable and robust code.

The assert() function is used to check for certain conditions at runtime. If the condition is not met, the function generates an AssertionError exception. For example:assert($x > 0, '$x must be greater than zero');In this example, the assert() function checks whether $x is greater than zero. If it is not, an AssertionError exception is thrown with the message "$x must be greater than zero".

The throws keyword, on the other hand, is used to specify which exceptions a function or method can throw. This can be helpful for documenting your code and making it easier for other developers to understand how your functions and methods behave. For example:function divide(int $a, int $b): int
{
    if ($b === 0) {
        throw new DivisionByZeroError('Cannot divide by zero');
    }

    return $a / $b;
}In this example, the divide() function uses the throws keyword to specify that it can throw a DivisionByZeroError exception if the second argument is zero.

Overall, the assert() function and the throws keyword are useful tools for handling errors and exceptions in PHP and can help you write more reliable and robust code.

Support for enumerations 
Support for enumerations was one of the most prominent features of PHP 8.1. Enums allow developers to programmatically enforce states in their codebase. Below is an example of an enum: <?php

namespace App\Enums;

enum InvoiceStatus: string {
    case draft = 'draft';
    case pending = 'pending';
    case paid = 'paid';
    case expired = 'expired';
}

Other PHP 8.1 features 

 Support for `read-only` properties was added.
 After the introduction of array unpacking in PHP 7.4 with consecutively numbered keys, PHP 8.1 introduced support for array unpacking with string keys.
 PHP 8.1 added support for using `new` in initializers.
 A new syntax was added for creating callables.
 PHP 8.1 brought support for Pure Intersection Types, after the introduction of union types in PHP 8.0.

PHP 8.2 
PHP 8.2 includes a number of new features and improvements. Here are some of the main ones:

 Union Types: Union types allow you to specify that a function or method parameter can accept multiple types, separated by the "|" symbol. This can help to improve type safety and reduce the need for type juggling.
 Nullsafe Operator: The nullsafe operator (?->) allows you to chain method calls without having to check for null values at each step. This can help to reduce the need for null checks and make your code more concise.
 Match Expression: The match expression allows you to perform pattern matching on values, similar to a switch statement in other languages. This can be a more concise and expressive way to handle multiple conditions.
 Improved Type Variance: PHP 8.2 introduces improved type variance for generic types, allowing you to specify whether a generic type is covariant, contravariant, or invariant. This can help to improve type safety and flexibility when working with generic types.
 Performance Improvements: PHP 8.2 includes various performance improvements, including faster JIT compilation, faster garbage collection, and improved handling of large arrays. These improvements can help to make PHP applications faster and more efficient.
 Deprecations: Some features have been deprecated in PHP 8.2, including the assert() function when used with a string argument, and the list() construct with a single array element. It's important to be aware of these deprecations if you are upgrading from an earlier version of PHP.
Here are some examples of features that have been deprecated in PHP 8.2:
 assert() function with string argument: The assert() function can be used to perform runtime checks, but it has been deprecated when used with a string argument. Instead, you should use the assert() function with a boolean argument or an expression.
 list() construct with a single array element: The list() construct allows you to unpack the elements of an array into separate variables. It has been deprecated when used with a single array element, as this usage was considered confusing and error-prone.
 create_function(): The create_function() function has been deprecated, as it has been superseded by anonymous functions, which are more flexible and easier to use.
 mb_ereg_replace_callback(): The mb_ereg_replace_callback() function has been deprecated, as it has been superseded by the preg_replace_callback() function, which provides similar functionality and is more widely used.
 Callables that are not accepted by the $callable() syntax (but are accepted by call_user_func()) are deprecated.

New "Random" extension

The "Random" extension provides a new object-oriented API for generating random values in PHP. It includes several classes ("Engine"s) that implement different algorithms for generating random numbers and storing their state within objects. This allows for multiple independent seedable sequences, which can be useful in certain contexts, such as testing or simulation.

The \Random\Randomizer class provides a high-level interface for using the engine's randomness to generate a random integer, shuffle an array or string, select random array keys, and more. This can be a convenient way to perform these common tasks without having to directly use the lower-level engine classes.

It's worth noting that the "Random" extension is not enabled by default in PHP, and you will need to install and enable it in your PHP environment in order to use its features. You can find more information about the extension in the official PHP documentation.

Release history 

Beginning on 28 June 2011, the PHP Development Team implemented a timeline for the release of new versions of PHP. Under this system, at least one release should occur every month. Once per year, a minor release should occur which may include new features. Every minor release should at least be supported for two years with security and bug fixes, followed by at least one year of only security fixes, for a total of a three-year release process for every minor release. No new features, unless small and self-contained, are to be introduced into a minor release during the three-year release process.

Mascot 

The mascot of the PHP project is the elePHPant, a blue elephant with the PHP logo on its side, designed by Vincent Pontier in 1998. "The (PHP) letters were forming the shape of an elephant if viewed in a sideways angle." The elePHPant is sometimes differently coloured when in plush toy form.

Many variations of this mascot have been made over the years. Only the elePHPants based on the original design by Vincent Pontier are considered official by the community. These are collectable and some of them are extremely rare.

Syntax 

The following "Hello, World!" program is written in PHP code embedded in an HTML document:

<!DOCTYPE html>
<html>
    <head>
        <title>PHP "Hello, World!" program</title>
    </head>
    <body>
        <?php
            echo '<p>Hello, World!</p>';
        ?>
    </body>
</html>

However, as no requirement exists for PHP code to be embedded in HTML, the simplest version of Hello, World! may be written like this, with the closing tag ?> omitted as preferred in files containing pure PHP code.

<?php echo 'Hello, World!';

The PHP interpreter only executes PHP code within its delimiters. Anything outside of its delimiters is not processed by PHP, although the non-PHP text is still subject to control structures described in PHP code. The most common delimiters are <?php to open and ?> to close PHP sections. The shortened form <? also exists. This short delimiter makes script files less portable since support for them can be disabled in the local PHP configuration and it is therefore discouraged. Conversely, there is no recommendation against the echo short tag <?=. Prior to PHP 5.4.0, this short syntax for echo only works with the short_open_tag configuration setting enabled, while for PHP 5.4.0 and later it is always available. The purpose of all these delimiters is to separate PHP code from non-PHP content, such as JavaScript code or HTML markup. So the shortest "Hello, World!" program written in PHP is:
<?='Hello, World!';
The first form of delimiters, <?php and ?>, in XHTML and other XML documents, creates correctly formed XML processing instructions. This means that the resulting mixture of PHP code and other markups in the server-side file is itself well-formed XML.

Variables are prefixed with a dollar symbol, and a type does not need to be specified in advance. PHP 5 introduced type declarations that allow functions to force their parameters to be objects of a specific class, arrays, interfaces or callback functions. However, before PHP 7, type declarations could not be used with scalar types such as integers or strings.

Below is an example of how PHP variables are declared and initialized.
<?php
    $name = 'John';  // variable of string type being declared and initialized
    $age = 18;       // variable of integer type being declared and initialized
    $height = 5.3;   // variable of double type being declared and initialized
    echo $name . ' is ' . $height . "m tall\n"; // concatenating variables and strings
    echo "$name is $age years old."; // interpolating variables to string
?>
Unlike function and class names, variable names are case-sensitive. Both double-quoted ("") and heredoc strings provide the ability to interpolate a variable's value into the string. PHP treats newlines as whitespace in the manner of a free-form language, and statements are terminated by a semicolon. PHP has three types of comment syntax: /* */ marks block and inline comments; // or # are used for one-line comments. The echo statement is one of several facilities PHP provides to output text.

In terms of keywords and language syntax, PHP is similar to C-style syntax. if conditions, for and while loops and function returns are similar in syntax to languages such as C, C++, C#, Java and Perl.

Data types 
PHP is loosely typed. It stores integers in a platform-dependent range, either as a 32, 64 or 128-bit signed integer equivalent to the C-language long type. Unsigned integers are converted to signed values in certain situations, which is different behaviour to many other programming languages. Integer variables can be assigned using decimal (positive and negative), octal, hexadecimal, and binary notations.

Floating point numbers are also stored in a platform-specific range. They can be specified using floating point notation, or two forms of scientific notation. PHP has a native Boolean type that is similar to the native Boolean types in Java and C++. Using the Boolean type conversion rules, non-zero values are interpreted as true and zero as false, as in Perl and C++.

The null data type represents a variable that has no value; NULL is the only allowed value for this data type.

Variables of the "resource" type represent references to resources from external sources. These are typically created by functions from a particular extension, and can only be processed by functions from the same extension; examples include file, image, and database resources.

Arrays can contain elements of any type that PHP can handle, including resources, objects, and even other arrays. Order is preserved in lists of values and in hashes with both keys and values, and the two can be intermingled. PHP also supports strings, which can be used with single quotes, double quotes, nowdoc or heredoc syntax.

The Standard PHP Library (SPL) attempts to solve standard problems and implements efficient data access interfaces and classes.

Functions 
PHP defines a large array of functions in the core language and many are also available in various extensions; these functions are well documented online PHP documentation. However, the built-in library has a wide variety of naming conventions and associated inconsistencies, as described under history above.

Custom functions may be defined by the developer:
function myAge(int $birthYear): string
{
    // calculate the age by subtracting the birth year from the current year.
    $yearsOld = date('Y') - $birthYear;

    // return the age in a descriptive string.
    return $yearsOld . ($yearsOld == 1 ? ' year' : ' years');
}

echo 'I am currently ' . myAge(1995) . ' old.';

In lieu of function pointers, functions in PHP can be referenced by a string containing their name. In this manner, normal PHP functions can be used, for example, as callbacks or within function tables. User-defined functions may be created at any time without being prototyped. Functions may be defined inside code blocks, permitting a run-time decision as to whether or not a function should be defined. There is a function_exists function that determines whether a function with a given name has already been defined. Function calls must use parentheses, with the exception of zero-argument class constructor functions called with the PHP operator new, in which case parentheses are optional.

Since PHP 4.0.1 create_function(), a thin wrapper around eval(), allowed normal PHP functions to be created during program execution; it was deprecated in PHP 7.2 and removed in PHP 8.0 in favor of syntax for anonymous functions or "closures" that can capture variables from the surrounding scope, which was added in PHP 5.3. Shorthand arrow syntax was added in PHP 7.4:

function getAdder($x) {
    return fn($y) => $x + $y;
}

$adder = getAdder(8);
echo $adder(2);  // prints "10"

In the example above, getAdder() function creates a closure using passed argument , which takes an additional argument , and returns the created closure to the caller. Such a function is a first-class object, meaning that it can be stored in a variable, passed as a parameter to other functions, etc.

Unusually for a dynamically typed language, PHP supports type declarations on function parameters, which are enforced at runtime. This has been supported for classes and interfaces since PHP 5.0, for arrays since PHP 5.1, for "callables" since PHP 5.4, and scalar (integer, float, string and boolean) types since PHP 7.0. PHP 7.0 also has type declarations for function return types, expressed by placing the type name after the list of parameters, preceded by a colon. For example, the getAdder function from the earlier example could be annotated with types like so in PHP 7:

function getAdder(int $x): Closure
{
    return fn(int $y): int => $x + $y;
}

$adder = getAdder(8);
echo $adder(2); // prints "10"
echo $adder(null); // throws an exception because an incorrect type was passed
$adder = getAdder([]); // would also throw an exception

By default, scalar type declarations follow weak typing principles. So, for example, if a parameter's type is int, PHP would allow not only integers, but also convertible numeric strings, floats or booleans to be passed to that function, and would convert them. However, PHP 7 has a "strict typing" mode which, when used, disallows such conversions for function calls and returns within a file.

PHP Objects 
Basic object-oriented programming functionality was added in PHP 3 and improved in PHP 4. This allowed for PHP to gain further abstraction, making creative tasks easier for programmers using the language. Object handling was completely rewritten for PHP 5, expanding the feature set and enhancing performance. In previous versions of PHP, objects were handled like value types. The drawback of this method was that code had to make heavy use of PHP's "reference" variables if it wanted to modify an object it was passed rather than creating a copy of it. In the new approach, objects are referenced by handle, and not by value.

PHP 5 introduced private and protected member variables and methods, along with abstract classes, final classes, abstract methods, and final methods. It also introduced a standard way of declaring constructors and destructors, similar to that of other object-oriented languages such as C++, and a standard exception handling model. Furthermore, PHP 5 added interfaces and allowed for multiple interfaces to be implemented. There are special interfaces that allow objects to interact with the runtime system. Objects implementing ArrayAccess can be used with array syntax and objects implementing Iterator or IteratorAggregate can be used with the foreach language construct. There is no virtual table feature in the engine, so static variables are bound with a name instead of a reference at compile time.

If the developer creates a copy of an object using the reserved word clone, the Zend engine will check whether a __clone() method has been defined. If not, it will call a default __clone() which will copy the object's properties. If a __clone() method is defined, then it will be responsible for setting the necessary properties in the created object. For convenience, the engine will supply a function that imports the properties of the source object, so the programmer can start with a by-value replica of the source object and only override properties that need to be changed.

The visibility of PHP properties and methods is defined using the keywords public, private, and protected. The default is public, if only var is used; var is a synonym for public. Items declared public can be accessed everywhere. protected limits access to inherited classes (and to the class that defines the item). private limits visibility only to the class that defines the item. Objects of the same type have access to each other's private and protected members even though they are not the same instance.

Example 
The following is a basic example of object-oriented programming in PHP 8:

<?php

abstract class User
{
    protected string $name;

    public function __construct(string $name)
    {
        // make first letter uppercase and the rest lowercase
        $this->name = ucfirst(strtolower($name));
    }

    public function greet(): string
    {
        return "Hello, my name is " . $this->name;
    }

    abstract public function job(): string;
}

class Student extends User
{
    public function __construct(string $name, private string $course)
    {
        parent::__construct($name);
    }

    public function job(): string
    {
        return "I learn " . $this->course;
    }
}

class Teacher extends User
{
    public function __construct(string $name, private array $teachingCourses)
    {
        parent::__construct($name);
    }

    public function job(): string
    {
        return "I teach " . implode(", ", $this->teachingCourses);
    }
}

$students = [
    new Student("Alice", "Computer Science"),
    new Student("Bob", "Computer Science"),
    new Student("Charlie", "Business Studies"),
];

$teachers = [
    new Teacher("Dan", ["Computer Science", "Information Security"]),
    new Teacher("Erin", ["Computer Science", "3D Graphics Programming"]),
    new Teacher("Frankie", ["Online Marketing", "Business Studies", "E-commerce"]),
];

foreach ([$students, $teachers] as $users) {
    echo $users[0]::class . "s:\n";

    array_walk($users, function (User $user) {
        echo "{$user->greet()}, {$user->job()}\n";
    });
}

This program outputs the following:
Students:
Hello, my name is Alice, I learn Computer Science
Hello, my name is Bob, I learn Computer Science
Hello, my name is Charlie, I learn Business Studies
Teachers:
Hello, my name is Dan, I teach Computer Science, Information Security
Hello, my name is Erin, I teach Computer Science, 3D Graphics Programming
Hello, my name is Frankie, I teach Online Marketing, Business Studies, E-commerce

Implementations 
The only complete PHP implementation is the original, known simply as PHP. It is the most widely used and is powered by the Zend Engine. To disambiguate it from other implementations, it is sometimes unofficially called "Zend PHP". The Zend Engine compiles PHP source code on-the-fly into an internal format that it can execute, thus it works as an interpreter. It is also the "reference implementation" of PHP, as PHP has no formal specification, and so the semantics of Zend PHP define the semantics of PHP. Due to the complex and nuanced semantics of PHP, defined by how Zend works, it is difficult for competing implementations to offer complete compatibility.

PHP's single-request-per-script-execution model, and the fact that the Zend Engine is an interpreter, leads to inefficiency; as a result, various products have been developed to help improve PHP performance. In order to speed up execution time and not have to compile the PHP source code every time the web page is accessed, PHP scripts can also be deployed in the PHP engine's internal format by using an opcode cache, which works by caching the compiled form of a PHP script (opcodes) in shared memory to avoid the overhead of parsing and compiling the code every time the script runs. An opcode cache, Zend Opcache, is built into PHP since version 5.5. Another example of a widely used opcode cache is the Alternative PHP Cache (APC), which is available as a PECL extension.

While Zend PHP is still the most popular implementation, several other implementations have been developed. Some of these are compilers or support JIT compilation, and hence offer performance benefits over Zend PHP at the expense of lacking full PHP compatibility. Alternative implementations include the following:

 HHVM (HipHop Virtual Machine) – developed at Facebook and available as open source, it converts PHP code into a high-level bytecode (commonly known as an intermediate language), which is then translated into x86-64 machine code dynamically at runtime by a just-in-time (JIT) compiler, resulting in up to 6× performance improvements. However, since version 7.2 Zend has outperformed HHVM, and HHVM 3.24 is the last version to officially support PHP.
 HipHop – developed at Facebook and available as open source, it transforms the PHP scripts into C++ code and then compiles the resulting code, reducing the server load up to 50%. In early 2013, Facebook deprecated it in favour of HHVM due to multiple reasons, including deployment difficulties and lack of support for the whole PHP language, including the create_function() and eval() constructs.
 Parrot – a virtual machine designed to run dynamic languages efficiently; the cross-translator Pipp transforms the PHP source code into the Parrot intermediate representation, which is then translated into the Parrot's bytecode and executed by the virtual machine.
 PeachPie – a second-generation compiler to .NET Common Intermediate Language (CIL) bytecode, built on the Roslyn platform; successor of Phalanger, sharing several architectural components
 Phalanger – compiles PHP into .Net Common Intermediate Language bytecode; predecessor of PeachPie
 Quercus – compiles PHP into Java bytecode

Licensing 

PHP is free software released under the PHP License, which stipulates that:

This restriction on the use of "PHP" makes the PHP License incompatible with the General Public License (GPL), while the Zend License is incompatible due to an advertising clause similar to that of the original BSD license.

Development and community 
PHP includes various free and open-source libraries in its source distribution or uses them in resulting PHP binary builds. PHP is fundamentally an Internet-aware system with built-in modules for accessing File Transfer Protocol (FTP) servers and many database servers, including PostgreSQL, MySQL, Microsoft SQL Server and SQLite (which is an embedded database), LDAP servers, and others. Numerous functions are familiar to C programmers, such as those in the stdio family, are available in standard PHP builds.

PHP allows developers to write extensions in C to add functionality to the PHP language. PHP extensions can be compiled statically into PHP or loaded dynamically at runtime. Numerous extensions have been written to add support for the Windows API, process management on Unix-like operating systems, multibyte strings (Unicode), cURL, and several popular compression formats. Other PHP features made available through extensions include integration with Internet Relay Chat (IRC), dynamic generation of images and Adobe Flash content, PHP Data Objects (PDO) as an abstraction layer used for accessing databases, and even speech synthesis. Some of the language's core functions, such as those dealing with strings and arrays, are also implemented as extensions. The PHP Extension Community Library (PECL) project is a repository for extensions to the PHP language.

Some other projects, such as Zephir, provide the ability for PHP extensions to be created in a high-level language and compiled into native PHP extensions. Such an approach, instead of writing PHP extensions directly in C, simplifies the development of extensions and reduces the time required for programming and testing.

By December 2018 the PHP Group consisted of ten people: Thies C. Arntzen, Stig Bakken, Shane Caraveo, Andi Gutmans, Rasmus Lerdorf, Sam Ruby, Sascha Schumann, Zeev Suraski, Jim Winstead, and Andrei Zmievski.

Zend Technologies provides a PHP Certification based on PHP 7 exam (and previously based on PHP 5.5) for programmers to become certified PHP developers.

PHP Foundation 
On November 26, 2021, the JetBrains blog announced the creation of the PHP Foundation, which will sponsor the design and development of PHP.

Installation and configuration 

There are two primary ways for adding support for PHP to a web server – as a native web server module, or as a CGI executable. PHP has a direct module interface called server application programming interface (SAPI), which is supported by many web servers including Apache HTTP Server, Microsoft IIS and iPlanet Web Server. Some other web servers, such as OmniHTTPd, support the Internet Server Application Programming Interface (ISAPI), which is Microsoft's web server module interface. If PHP has no module support for a web server, it can always be used as a Common Gateway Interface (CGI) or FastCGI processor; in that case, the web server is configured to use PHP's CGI executable to process all requests to PHP files.

PHP-FPM (FastCGI Process Manager) is an alternative FastCGI implementation for PHP, bundled with the official PHP distribution since version 5.3.3. When compared to the older FastCGI implementation, it contains some additional features, mostly useful for heavily loaded web servers.

When using PHP for command-line scripting, a PHP command-line interface (CLI) executable is needed. PHP supports a CLI server application programming interface (SAPI) since PHP 4.3.0. The main focus of this SAPI is developing shell applications using PHP. There are quite a few differences between the CLI SAPI and other SAPIs, although they do share many of the same behaviours.

PHP has a direct module interface called SAPI for different web servers; in case of PHP 5 and Apache 2.0 on Windows, it is provided in form of a DLL file called , which is a module that, among other functions, provides an interface between PHP and the web server, implemented in a form that the server understands. This form is what is known as a SAPI.

There are different kinds of SAPIs for various web server extensions. For example, in addition to those listed above, other SAPIs for the PHP language include the Common Gateway Interface and command-line interface.

PHP can also be used for writing desktop graphical user interface (GUI) applications, by using the PHP-GTK extension. PHP-GTK is not included in the official PHP distribution, and as an extension, it can be used only with PHP versions 5.1.0 and newer. The most common way of installing PHP-GTK is by compiling it from the source code.

When PHP is installed and used in cloud environments, software development kits (SDKs) are provided for using cloud-specific features. For example:
 Amazon Web Services provides the AWS SDK for PHP
 Microsoft Azure can be used with the Windows Azure SDK for PHP.

Numerous configuration options are supported, affecting both core PHP features and extensions. Configuration file php.ini is searched for in different locations, depending on the way PHP is used. The configuration file is split into various sections, while some of the configuration options can be also set within the web server configuration.

Use 

PHP is a general-purpose scripting language that is especially suited to server-side web development, in which case PHP generally runs on a web server. Any PHP code in a requested file is executed by the PHP runtime, usually to create dynamic web page content or dynamic images used on websites or elsewhere. It can also be used for command-line scripting and client-side graphical user interface (GUI) applications. PHP can be deployed on most web servers, many operating systems and platforms, and can be used with many relational database management systems (RDBMS). Most web hosting providers support PHP for use by their clients. It is available free of charge, and the PHP Group provides the complete source code for users to build, customize and extend for their own use.

Originally designed to create dynamic web pages, PHP now focuses mainly on server-side scripting, and it is similar to other server-side scripting languages that provide dynamic content from a web server to a client, such as Microsoft's ASP.NET, Sun Microsystems' JavaServer Pages, and mod_perl. PHP has also attracted the development of many software frameworks that provide building blocks and a design structure to promote rapid application development (RAD). Some of these include PRADO, CakePHP, Symfony, CodeIgniter, Laravel, Yii Framework, Phalcon and Laminas, offering features similar to other web frameworks.

The LAMP architecture has become popular in the web industry as a way of deploying web applications. PHP is commonly used as the P in this bundle alongside Linux, Apache and MySQL, although the P may also refer to Python, Perl, or some mix of the three. Similar packages, WAMP and MAMP, are also available for Windows and macOS, with the first letter standing for the respective operating system. Although both PHP and Apache are provided as part of the macOS base install, users of these packages seek a simpler installation mechanism that can be more easily kept up to date.

For specific and more advanced usage scenarios, PHP offers a well-defined and documented way for writing custom extensions in C or C++. Besides extending the language itself in form of additional libraries, extensions are providing a way for improving execution speed where it is critical and there is room for improvements by using a true compiled language. PHP also offers well-defined ways for embedding itself into other software projects. That way PHP can be easily used as an internal scripting language for another project, also providing tight interfacing with the project's specific internal data structures.

PHP received mixed reviews due to lacking support for multithreading at the core language level, though using threads is made possible by the "pthreads" PECL extension.

A command line interface, php-cli, and two ActiveX Windows Script Host scripting engines for PHP have been produced.

Popularity and usage statistics

PHP is used for Web content management systems including MediaWiki, WordPress, Joomla, Drupal, Moodle, eZ Publish, eZ Platform, and SilverStripe.

, PHP was used in more than 240 million websites (39% of those sampled) and was installed on 2.1 million web servers.

, PHP was used as the server-side programming language on 79.1% of websites, down from 83.5% previously, where the language could be determined, and PHP 7 is the most used version of the language with 50.3% of all websites on the web using that version.

Security 
In 2019, 11% of all vulnerabilities listed by the National Vulnerability Database were linked to PHP; historically, about 30% of all vulnerabilities listed since 1996 in this database are linked to PHP. Technical security flaws of the language itself or of its core libraries are not frequent (22 in 2009, about 1% of the total although PHP applies to about 20% of programs listed). Recognizing that programmers make mistakes, some languages include taint checking to automatically detect the lack of input validation which induces many issues. Such a feature is being developed for PHP, but its inclusion into a release has been rejected several times in the past.

There are advanced protection patches such as Suhosin and Hardening-Patch, specially designed for web hosting environments.

Historically, old versions of PHP had some configuration parameters and default values for such runtime settings that made some PHP applications prone to security issues. Among these, magic_quotes_gpc and register_globals configuration directives were the best known; the latter made any URL parameters become PHP variables, opening a path for serious security vulnerabilities by allowing an attacker to set the value of any uninitialized global variable and interfere with the execution of a PHP script. Support for "magic quotes" and "register globals" settings has been deprecated since PHP 5.3.0, and removed from PHP 5.4.0.

Another example for the potential runtime-settings vulnerability comes from failing to disable PHP execution (for example by using the engine configuration directive) for the directory where uploaded files are stored; enabling it can result in the execution of malicious code embedded within the uploaded files. The best practice is to either locate the image directory outside of the document root available to the web server and serve it via an intermediary script or disable PHP execution for the directory which stores the uploaded files.

Also, enabling the dynamic loading of PHP extensions (via enable_dl configuration directive) in a shared web hosting environment can lead to security issues.

Implied type conversions that result in different values being treated as equal, sometimes against the programmer's intent, can lead to security issues. For example, the result of the comparison  is true, because strings that are parsable as numbers are converted to numbers; in this case, the first compared value is treated as scientific notation having the value, which is zero. Errors like this resulted in authentication vulnerabilities in Simple Machines Forum, Typo3 and phpBB when MD5 password hashes were compared. The recommended way is to use hash_equals() (for timing attack safety), strcmp or the identity operator (===), as  results in false.

In a 2013 analysis of over 170,000 website defacements, published by Zone-H, the most frequently (53%) used technique was the exploitation of file-inclusion vulnerability, mostly related to insecure usage of the PHP language constructs include, require, and allow_url_fopen.

 W3Techs reports that 64% 
of websites using PHP, use versions 7.2 or older (which are no longer supported by The PHP Development Team) with 35% 
of all PHP websites using version 5.6 or older.

Version 5 is still used by 24.5% of all websites (September 2021). It is highly recommended to migrate to PHP version 7 or 8 and use random_int() instead of rand() or mt_rand(), as the latter functions are not cryptographically-secure. There are two attacks that can be performed over PHP entropy sources: "seed attack" and "state recovery attack". With current GPU technologies, an attacker can perform up to 2 MD5 calculations per second with a $250 GPU, while with an additional $500 can reach up to 2 calculations. In combination with a "birthday attack" this can lead to serious security vulnerabilities.

See also 

 Comparison of programming languages
 List of Apache–MySQL–PHP packages
 List of PHP accelerators
 List of PHP editors
 PEAR (PHP Extension and Application Repository)
 PHP accelerator
 Template processor
 XAMPP (free and open-source cross-platform web server solution stack package)
 Zend Server

References

Further reading

External links

 
 

 
1995 software
Articles with example PHP code
Class-based programming languages
Cross-platform software
Dynamic programming languages
Dynamically typed programming languages
Filename extensions
Free compilers and interpreters
High-level programming languages
Internet terminology
Object-oriented programming languages
PHP software
Procedural programming languages
Programming languages
Programming languages created in 1995
Scripting languages
Software using the PHP license
Text-oriented programming languages